Big Guns may refer to:

"Big Guns" (Dad's Army), a 1969 episode of Dad's Army
Big Guns (pinball), a pinball machine
 Big Guns (TV series), a 1958 British TV series
Big Guns (1973 film) or Tony Arzenta, starring Alain Delon
Big Guns (1987 film), a 1987 gay pornographic film
Big Guns (novel), a 2018 satirical novel by Steve Israel
"Big Guns", a song on Skid Row's 1989  album Skid Row
Big Guns (album), an album by Rory Gallagher
"The Big Guns", an episode of the television series Modern Family
The Big Guns (professional wrestling), a Japanese professional wrestling tag team